Krum Georgiev Bibishkov (born 2 September 1982) is a Bulgarian former footballer, and currently serves as a head coach and club representative for SC Real Mississauga in the Canadian Soccer League.

Career
He started his career in his home town of Blagoevgrad where he represented the local team Pirin. He played for Pirin Blagoevgrad in six matches, scoring one goal. In August 1999, Bayern Munich signed Bibishkov. In July 2000, he returned to Bulgaria, signing a contract with Levski Sofia. In June 2002, Bibishkov transferred to Marek Dupnitsa, where he played in the UEFA Intertoto Cup. In June 2005, he signed with Portuguese Maritimo. However was loaned out to FC Penafiel the following season.

In January 2007, Bibishkov was transferred to Litex Lovech, with whom he won the 2008 Bulgarian Cup. In December 2008, he was named the 2008 Footballer of the Year of Litex, and participated in the 2007–08 UEFA Cup. In the spring of 2007, Bibishkov scored five goals in the 11:0 win over Chernomorets Burgas Sofia. On 6 July 2009, he signed a three-year contract as a free transfer with Romanian team Steaua București. During his tenure in București he played in the 2009–10 UEFA Europa League. On 3 February 2010, Bibishkov signed a one-and-a-half-year contract with Portuguese club Académica de Coimbra.

He went abroad once more to play with Hapoel Ramat Gan Givatayim F.C. in the Liga Leumit. In 2011, he returned to Bulgaria to play with Pirin Blagoevgrad, Minyor Pernik, Lokomotiv Sofia. In 2014, he assisted Marek Dupnitsa in securing promotion by winning the Second Professional Football League. He went overseas in 2016 to play with the Brantford Galaxy in the Canadian Soccer League. The following season he was recruited by Scarborough SC as a Player-coach.

He also played with SC Real Mississauga in the 2018 season. In 2020, he returned to Scarborough SC and assisted in reaching the championship final against FC Vorkuta, but were defeated by a score of 2–1.

Managerial career 
While in the CSL he made the transition to managing in 2017, where he was appointed in the capacity of a player-coach for Scarborough SC. Bibishkov achieved a notable result in his first year by reaching the CSL Championship final, where they were defeated 5–4 in a penalty shootout against York Region Shooters. He was associated with CFA academy, where he served as the U-11 head coach. In 2018, he became involved with SC Real Mississauga, and operated as a player-coach after the academy received a franchise in the Canadian Soccer League.

International career 
Bibishkov was a part of the Bulgarian national under-21 team and made one appearance for the senior side in 2001.

Honours 
PFC Litex Lovech
 Bulgarian Cup: 2007–08, 2008–09

References

External links 
 Profile at Levskisofia.info 

1982 births
Living people
Sportspeople from Blagoevgrad Province
Bulgarian footballers
Bulgaria under-21 international footballers
Bulgaria international footballers
Bulgarian expatriate footballers
Bulgarian football managers
First Professional Football League (Bulgaria) players
OFC Pirin Blagoevgrad players
PFC Pirin Blagoevgrad players
PFC Levski Sofia players
PFC Marek Dupnitsa players
C.S. Marítimo players
F.C. Penafiel players
PFC Litex Lovech players
FC Steaua București players
FC Steaua II București players
FC Bayern Munich II players
Associação Académica de Coimbra – O.A.F. players
Hapoel Ramat Gan F.C. players
PFC Minyor Pernik players
FC Lokomotiv 1929 Sofia players
PFC Beroe Stara Zagora players
Brantford Galaxy players
Scarborough SC players
Expatriate footballers in Romania
Expatriate footballers in Germany
Expatriate footballers in Portugal
Bulgarian expatriates in Portugal
Expatriate footballers in Israel
Expatriate soccer players in Canada
Primeira Liga players
Liga I players
Canadian Soccer League (1998–present) players
Canadian Soccer League (1998–present) managers
Association football forwards